Wapwallopen may refer to the following in the U.S. state of Pennsylvania:

Wapwallopen, Pennsylvania, an unincorporated community in Luzerne County
Big Wapwallopen Creek, also known simply as Wapwallopen Creek, a tributary of the Susquehanna River
Little Wapwallopen Creek, a tributary of the Susquehanna River in Luzerne County